The Texas Technological College Historic District is a historic district listed on the National Register of Historic Places on the campus of Texas Tech University in Lubbock, Texas. The  district is made up of 27 contributing properties, four non-contributing properties, one contributing structure, one contributing object, and one contributing site.

History

Properties

 West Hall, built 1934 as "Men’s Dormitory #1"

Former buildings
Several buildings from the original 1920s construction period have been demolished including the original Bookstore (pre-existing when the campus land was purchased for the college), the 1925 Cafeteria (which became the book store in 1930 and was consumed by 1950s construction enlarging the store), the 1926 Agriculture Building (known as the Speech Building by 1942 and as the Speech Laboratory Theater by 1964, demolished 1983), the 1926 Athletic Field House and Assembly Hall (later known as the Gymnasium, demolished 1984), the 1926 Textile Engineering Annex (later known as Mechanical Engineering Shops), the 1927 Poultry Plant, and several green houses, frame sheds, pens, fences, and other small buildings associated with the agricultural area of campus.

See also

National Register of Historic Places listings in Lubbock County, Texas

References

External links

National Register Nomination Form, Texas Technological College Historic District

 
Texas Tech University campus
University and college buildings on the National Register of Historic Places in Texas
Historic districts on the National Register of Historic Places in Texas
National Register of Historic Places in Lubbock, Texas